TV9 (spelled as tivi sembilan) is a Malaysian free-to-air television network launched on 22 April 2006 as a subsidiary of Media Prima Berhad. It airs programming that tends mostly towards the Malay demographic. The channel formerly existed as Channel 9 from 9 September 2003 until 3 February 2005 due to financial difficulties faced by the operator. TV9 started broadcasting 24 hours a day on 6 May 2019.

History

As Channel 9/nine

nine was launched on 9 September 2003, broadcasting daily from 8:00 am to 3:00 am daily. Channel 9 was conceived and launched by media entrepreneur, Jamal Hassim. At the time it was a rare feat for a national free-to-air television network to be established by a private individual. Its headquarters was located at Temasya Industrial Park in Shah Alam, Selangor.

Channel Nine was acquired by Malaysia's largest media corporation, Media Prima Berhad. Media Prima announced its acquisition of 100% equity stake in Ch-9 Media Sdn Bhd and almost completed the company's ownership of all commercial free-to-air television channels in Malaysia.

Renamed as TV9 and early history 

Channel 9 was renamed as TV9, with test transmission commenced on Saturday, 1 April 2006 with 4-hour broadcasts from 8:00 pm to midnight daily and airing music videos mostly in Malay. Full launch of the channel began at noon of 22 April 2006 with 13-hour broadcasts from 12:00 pm to 1:00 am daily and a new slogan: Dekat di Hati (Malay for Close at heart). TV9 is available via terrestrial television in Peninsular Malaysia. Since 28 December 2006, it expanded its coverage to Sabah and Sarawak via pay television provider Astro Malaysia.

For the first months of broadcast, TV9 did not have its in-house news bulletin, except for Edisi 7 simulcasts from NTV7. TV9 began to produce news bulletins on New Year's Day 2007, under the Berita TV9 (literally: TV9 News) brand. It is currently broadcasting two half-hour editions: a midday edition at 1:00 pm Saturday to Thursday, and its flagship nightly edition at 8:00 pm.

On New Year's Day 2010, the channel launched a new tagline, Di Hatiku (At your heart in Malay), which actually used since its 3rd anniversary along 2009.

Inclusion of home shopping blocks 
Since 1 April 2016, Media Prima included home shopping block CJ Wow Shop, collaboration between them and Korean conglomerate CJ Group, to all of its channels lineup, including TV9. It currently airs on this channel from 6:00 am to 8:00 pm (with buffer periods at 1:00 pm from Saturday to Thursday to accommodate Berita TV9 Tengah Hari). Such long periods of teleshopping blocks has make this channel known as a part-time TV shopping channel. This block, however, attracted huge criticism by viewers through social media due to overtaking a large part of daytime schedule, previously running mostly reruns, religious programming and children's programming. On 4 March 2018, Friday to Sunday breakfast show Nasi Lemak Kopi O (which formerly occupied the first two-hour block of CJ WOW Shop) ended its 10-year run; thus gave the home shopping block a weekend extension.

On 5 March 2018, TV9 revamped its programming lineup to solely focus on rural Malay communities in order to reduce viewership. Media Prima did so as part of its television revamp which saw its channels aligning with a specific core audience. Korean and English programmes aired on the channel were then transferred to the NTV7, which also revamped on the same day to serve the "Modern Malaysia" audience.

From 31 December 2018, Media Prima made a major restructuring overhaul among all of its channels, as well as few rumoured job losses. Tanyalah Ustaz and Indonesian dramas were moved to the main TV3 so they can extend CJ Wow Shop's airtime at 6.00 AM to before afternoon news (excluding Friday) and 1.30 PM to 8.00 PM. Reruns of axed TV3 and NTV7 shows were also aired TV9 as NTV7 extended the Mandarin variant of CJ WOW Shop's airtime. Teleshopping block CJ Wow Shop became a fully owned subsidiary on 1 November 2020 after the group bought CJ's remaining 49% stake and was rebranded as simply Wow Shop.

End of TV9 News afternoon slot 
The afternoon slot of TV9 News aired its final edition on 31 October 2020 and begin to simultaneously broadcast afternoon news from TV3 on the following day.

From 15 to 30 September 2021, according to the viewership statistics from Media Prima Omnia, the viewership share for TV9 has increased from 2% to 15%, making the channel become the second most-watched television station in Malaysia after TV3 (which the viewership share for TV3 is about 17%), together with NTV7, which has the same viewership share of 15%.

See also 
 List of television stations in Malaysia
 List of programmes broadcast by TV9 (Malaysia)

References

External links 
 

2003 establishments in Malaysia
2006 establishments in Malaysia
Media Prima
Television stations in Malaysia
Television channels and stations established in 2003
Television channels and stations disestablished in 2005
Television channels and stations established in 2006
Malay language television stations
2005 disestablishments in Malaysia